In mathematics, the Koszul cohomology groups  are groups associated to a projective variety X with a line bundle L. They were introduced by , and named after Jean-Louis Koszul as they are closely related to the Koszul complex.

 surveys early work on Koszul cohomology,  gives an introduction to Koszul cohomology, and  gives a more advanced survey.

Definitions

If M is a graded module over the symmetric algebra of a vector space V, then the Koszul cohomology  of M is the cohomology of the sequence 

If L is a line bundle over a projective variety X, then the Koszul cohomology  is given by the Koszul cohomology  of the graded module , viewed as a module over the symmetric algebra of the vector space .

References

Algebraic geometry
Cohomology theories